The Piper PA-38-112 Tomahawk is a two-seat, fixed tricycle gear general aviation airplane, originally designed for flight training, touring and personal use.

Design and development
The Tomahawk is a single-engined low-wing cantilever monoplane with a T-tail and an enclosed cabin for two. It has a fixed tricycle landing gear and is powered by a Lycoming O-235 four-cylinder piston engine with a twin-bladed tractor propeller. The Tomahawk has two front-hinged doors for access to the cabin.

The Tomahawk was Piper's attempt at creating an affordable two-place trainer. Before designing the aircraft, Piper widely surveyed flight instructors for their input into the design. Instructors requested a more spinnable aircraft for training purposes, since other two-place trainers such as the Cessna 150 and 152 were designed to spontaneously fly out of a spin. The Tomahawk's NASA GA(W)-1 Whitcomb airfoil addresses this requirement by making specific pilot input necessary in recovering from spins, thus allowing pilots to develop proficiency in dealing with spin recovery.

The Tomahawk was introduced in 1977 as a 1978 model. The aircraft was in continuous production until 1982 when production was completed, with 2,484 aircraft built.

The 1981 and 1982 models were designated as the Tomahawk II. They incorporated improved cabin heating and windshield defroster performance, an improved elevator trim system, improved engine thrust vector, 100% airframe zinc-chromate anti-corrosion treatment, better cockpit soundproofing, larger 6" wheels and tires for greater propeller ground clearance and improved performance on grass and dirt runways, among other enhancements.

Operational history 
As of 2020 a handful of Tomahawks are currently being used to train Australian Air Force Cadets in flight courses. These are operated from RAAF Base Amberley by 211 Squadron AAFC. These aircraft have been in service since the early 2000s.

Safety record 

According to the Aircraft Owners and Pilots Association Air Safety Foundation, which published a Safety Highlight report on the Piper Tomahawk, the Piper Tomahawk has a one-third lower accident rate per flying hour than the comparable Cessna 150/152 series of two-place benchmark trainers. The Tomahawk has a higher rate of fatal spin accidents per flying hour. The National Transportation Safety Board (NTSB) estimated that the Tomahawk's stall/spin accident rate was three to five times that of the Cessna 150/152.

According to the NTSB, the Tomahawk's wing design was modified after FAA certification tests, but was not retested. Changes included reducing the number of full wing ribs and cutting lightening holes in the main spar. The aircraft's engineers told the NTSB that the changes made to the design resulted in a wing that was soft and flexible, allowing its shape to become distorted and possibly causing unpredictable behavior in stalls and spins. The design engineers said that the GAW-1 airfoil required a rigid structure because it was especially sensitive to airfoil shape, and that use of a flexible surface with that airfoil would make the Tomahawk wing "a new and unknown commodity in stalls and spins."

Airworthiness Directive 83-14-08 issued in September 1983 mandated an additional pair of stall strips to be added to the inboard leading edge of the PA-38 wing to "standardize and improve the stall characteristics".

Specifications (PA-38-112 Tomahawk II)

See also

References

Sources
Taylor, John W.R. Jane's All The World's Aircraft 1982–83. London:Jane's Yearbooks, 1982. .

External links

Low-wing aircraft
Single-engined tractor aircraft
1970s United States civil trainer aircraft
Tomahawk
T-tail aircraft
Aircraft first flown in 1978